Iskandar Malaysia Studios is a studio complex located at a  site in Iskandar Puteri, Johor Bahru District, Johor, Malaysia, It targets the Asia-Pacific region.

History
Pinewood Shepperton plc entered into a strategic agreement with Khazanah Nasional Berhad (the investment holding arm of the Government of Malaysia) in connection with the development of a new film and television studio facility in Iskandar, Malaysia. Construction began towards the end of 2010, with completion initially expected by the end of 2012. The project designers were GDP Architects, Kuala Lumpur and structural engineer Hossein Rezai of Web Structures. The facility officially opened on 14 June 2014.

In July 2019, Pinewood Iskandar Malaysia Studios was rebranded to Iskandar Malaysia Studios and the affiliation with Pinewood Shepperton plc ended.

Stages, TV studios and facilities
The biggest stage at  has a water tank for productions that require work on or under water.

Productions

 Marco Polo (Netflix)
Lost in the Pacific (2015)
Projek Komedi Warna (2015) Astro Warna / Mustika HD / On the Go
Elak-Elak (2015) Astro Warna
Star Quest (2015) Astro Wah Lai Toi
Asia's Got Talent Season 1 (Auditions & Semi-finals Episode) (2015)
Astro Classic Golden Melody (2015) Astro AEC
Gempak Superstar (2016)
Sembang Teh Tarik Kaw (2016)
CS Go: Minor Championship Asia (2016)
Hi-5 (2017)
The Voice 决战好声 (Singapore/Malaysia edition) (2017)
T2 Asia-Pacific Table Tennis League Season 1 (2017)
Gegar Vaganza (Final) (2017)
Asia's Got Talent Season 2 (Auditions & Semi-finals Episode) (2017)
Hello, Mrs. Money (2018)
Asia's Got Talent Season 3 (Auditions & Semi-finals Episode) (2019)
Strike Back Season 7 (2019)
Enemy Within (2019)
Sembilan (2019)
Disney's Wizards of Warna Walk (2019)

References

2014 establishments in Malaysia
Buildings and structures in Iskandar Puteri
Malaysian film studios